Pirton is a large village and civil parish three miles northwest of Hitchin in Hertfordshire, England. The population of the civil parish at the 2011 census was 1,274. 

The church, rebuilt in 1877, but with the remains of its 12th-century tower, is built within the bailey of a former castle, Toot Hill. Pirton Grange, which was remodelled in the 18th century, is in the north of the parish, and is a particularly interesting, moated Elizabethan house with a timber-framed gatehouse. Hammonds Farm and Rectory Farm, with its tithe barn, are also Elizabethan.

Pirton first appeared in official records in the Domesday Book in 1086 within the hundred of Hitchin. The village was then known as Peritone (meaning 'Homestead of Pears')

The Icknield Way Path passes through the village on its  journey from Ivinghoe Beacon in Buckinghamshire to Knettishall Heath in Suffolk. The Icknield Way Trail, a multi-user route for walkers, horse riders and off-road cyclists also passes through the village.

There are two churches in Pirton - one Methodist, one Anglican. There is a village school which teaches children from reception to Year 6. Many students continue on at Hitchin Priory. There are two local pubs - the Motte and Bailey on Great Green, and the Fox on High Street. Pirton has both football and cricket clubs.

References

External links

Pirton Local History Group website
Pirton Parish Council Official website

Villages in Hertfordshire
Civil parishes in Hertfordshire